The Scottish Broadcasting Commission was established by the Scottish Government in August 2007. Its purpose is to conduct an independent investigation into television production and broadcasting in Scotland, and to define a strategic way forward for the industry.  All commissioners are to be unpaid.

Members
The commission is to be chaired by Blair Jenkins, former Head of News and Current Affairs at BBC Scotland and former Director of Broadcasting at STV.

The ordinary members are:
 Chris Ballance, former Green MSP, playwright, member of the Scottish Society of Playwrights and the Writers' Guild of Great Britain
 Norman Drummond, former BBC National Governor for Scotland and Chairman of the Broadcasting Council for Scotland
 Peter Fraser, Baron Fraser of Carmyllie, former Conservative MP, former Lord Advocate, convener of the Fraser Inquiry
 Murray Grigor, writer and film director
 Henry McLeish, former Labour First Minister
 Ray Michie, Baroness Michie of Gallanach, a Gaelic-speaker and a member of An Comunn Gàidhealach, former Vice-Chairman of the Scottish Liberal Democrats
 Professor Seona Reid, Director of Glasgow School of Art and former Director of the Scottish Arts Council
 Elaine C Smith, actress
 David Wightman, chief executive of computer games company Edgies, member of the Screen Industry Summit Group

The Scottish Broadcasting Commission published their final report on the Morning of 8 September 2008 in Edinburgh, Scotland.

See also
 Gaelic broadcasting in Scotland

References

External links
final report

2007 establishments in Scotland
Mass media in Scotland
Broadcasting in the United Kingdom
Reports of the Scottish Government
Scottish commissions and inquiries